The National Association for Bilingual Education (NABE) is an American advocacy group that provides teacher training, educational leadership, and  regarding individuals learning English as a second language. They oppose Structured English Immersion and favor bilingual education.  Their views and goals have often been perceived as being at odds with, and offering an alternative to, the views and goals of Teachers of English to Speakers of Other Languages. They also persuade bilingual students to express their feelings in many ways, such as writing and artwork.  Teachers and counselors can also be a part of it if they are connected to bilingual networks. NABE publishes the Bilingual Research Journal.

See also
 Bilingual Education
 Bilingual Education Act

References

External links
 Official website
 Is a Fuller Relinguification of TESOL Desirable?

Bilingual education
Language education in the United States
Educational organizations based in the United States